Adrián está de visita, a Colombian telenovela was conducted in 2001 by RTI for Caracol Televisión and Telemundo.

Cast 
 Walter Díaz as Adrian Espino "Luzbel"
 Margarita Ortega as Karem Franco
 María Elena Döehring as Elsa Estrada
 Luz Stella Luengas as Paulina Estrada
 Oscar Corbella as Fabio Franco
 Lino Martone as Cristian Franco
 Luis Fernando Salas as Asdrubal Zamora
 Mónica Mendoza as Lucía Estrada
 Daniel Ochoa as Esteban Calderón
 Margalida Castro as Mercedes Zamora
 Claudia Rocío Mora as Begoña Zamora
 Luz Mary Arias as Beatriz
 Heidi Corpus as Magaly
 Julio del Mar as Manuel
 Lorena McAlister as Maria Paula
 Lilian Vélez as Gloria
 Carlos Villa as Dominico
 John Ceballos as Camilo
 Oscar Fernando Muñoz as Wilfred
 Astrid Hernández as Silvia
 Alberto Marulanda as Leon
 Paula Vásquez as Miss
 Sandra Guzmán as Homaira
 Efraín Londo as Ejecutivo #1
 Juan Carlos Uribe as Ejecutivo #2
 Rebeca López as Zoraida
 Pedro A. Vargas as Jardinero
 Miguel A. Velandia as Fotógrafo
 Luz Stella Jaramillo as Mamá de Lucia
 Daniela Rodriguez as Lucia
 Claudia Arroyave as Ligia Salazar

References

External links 
 

Telemundo telenovelas
Caracol Televisión telenovelas
2001 telenovelas
American telenovelas
Colombian telenovelas
2001 American television series debuts
2002 American television series endings
2001 Colombian television series debuts
2002 Colombian television series endings
Spanish-language telenovelas
Television shows set in Bogotá